The Sob is a river in Yamalo-Nenets Autonomous Okrug, Russia.

The Sob flows across the Priuralsky and Shuryshkarsky districts. The Salekhard–Igarka Railway stretch of the Northern Railway runs along the valley of the Sob in the Polar Urals. Since it is of  relatively easy access, the river has become a tourist attraction as a Class I to IV destination for rafting and kayaking.

Course 
The Sob is a left tributary of the Ob river. It has its sources in the eastern slopes of the southern sector of the Polar Urals. After leaving the mountainous area, the river flows roughly southeastwards and southwards among small lakes in a floodplain located at the northwestern end of the West Siberian Plain. Kharp town is located by its banks in its middle course. The area is marked by permafrost, being often swampy, and with patches of tundra and coniferous taiga.

Tributaries  
The river is fed predominantly by snow and is frozen between October and June.

Fauna 
The main fish species in the river are muksun, peled, broad whitefish, nelma, and sturgeon.

See also
List of rivers of Russia

References

External links

Полярный Урал. Станция Собь и её окрестности
Rivers of Yamalo-Nenets Autonomous Okrug
West Siberian Plain